Secularization or secularisation may refer to:

 Secularization (church property)
 Secularization movement in the Philippines
 Secularization of Christmas
 Secularization of knowledge
 Secularization of monastic estates in Romania

See also 
 Secular (disambiguation)